Patricia Field (born February 12, 1942) is an American costume designer, stylist and fashion designer.

Early life

Field was born in 1942 in New York City to an Armenian father and a Greek mother, who emigrated from Plomari, Lesbos, Greece. Field is a lesbian. She was raised in Manhattan and Queens. She claimed credit for inventing the modern legging for women's fashion in the 1970s.

She was for many years romantically involved with costume designer Rebecca Weinberg (Field), with whom she partnered on Sex and the City.

Fashion career 
She was the owner of the eponymous boutique Patricia Field, which first opened on 8th Street, moved to West Broadway, and its last location was at 306 Bowery in NoHo, New York City. In 2016, Field sold her iconic retail property at 306 Bowery, after being in business for 50 years, and she continues to work in television and film.

Field has the ARTFashion Gallery which opened in 2018, where she focuses on selling art and hand painted original clothing and accessories by a group of hand curated artists, located in the Lower East Side in New York City.

Among others, Field's design influences include, John Galliano, Diane von Furstenberg, and Thierry Mugler. She was a mentor for fashion designer Hushidar Mortezaie.

Costuming 
Field met Sarah Jessica Parker during the filming of 1995's Miami Rhapsody. They became friends and worked together on the television series Sex and the City. Before the first season of Sex and the City, Parker and Darren Star asked Field to design the costumes for the series. During Field's tenure as costume designer on the series, the show became well known for the fashions. She went on to return as costume designer for the movie Sex and the City (2008) and the sequel Sex and the City 2 (2010). Field did not work on the costume for the 2021–2022, Sex and the City reboot, And Just Like That…. After the successes of the Sex in the City costumes she was in high demand for new projects in television and film. For her work on Sex and the City, Field was nominated for five Emmy Awards, with one win, and nominated for six Costume Designers Guild awards, with four wins. She is one out of six honorees of the 2008 Real Time Film Festival.

Field's television credits include Hope & Faith, Kath & Kim, Ugly Betty, Younger on TV Land, Murphy Brown (season 11), and Emily in Paris.  She served as costume designer for the feature film The Devil Wears Prada, for which she was nominated for an Academy Award for Best Costume Design.

She did the costume design for the film Second Act (2018) starring Jennifer Lopez, Vanessa Hudgens and Leah Remini.

She designed the outfits in Namie Amuro's music videos for her three songs "New Look", "Rock Steady", and "What A Feeling" from her single 60s 70s 80s; as well as Anna Vissi's music videos for Stin Pyra and Alitissa Psihi from her album Apagorevmeno.

She worked in the Asian market by creating the fashion behind the Chinese feature film Go Lala Go! (2010).  In 2011, she designed most of the outfits for the characters in a Taiwan television drama called Material Queen.

Television appearances 
Field appeared as the first guest judge during the first season of the Bravo reality television series Project Runway. Her eponymous boutique was featured in a 2007 episode of Kathy Griffin's reality show My Life on the D-List, as well as on a 2008 episode of Paris Hilton's My New BFF.

John Galliano controversy
On 25 February 2011, Dior announced that it had suspended its head designer John Galliano following his arrest over an alleged anti-semitic assault in a Paris bar. The next day, The Sun published a video on their website, in which Galliano hurls anti-semitic insults at a group of Italian women and declares "I love Hitler... People like you would be dead. Your mothers, your forefathers would all be fucking gassed."

In a statement, Natalie Portman, a Jewish American actress whose great-grandparents were murdered in Auschwitz and who has been an ambassador of Dior since 2010, expressed "disgust" at John Galliano's comments. Field defended Galliano by sending an email blast to 500 friends, blogs and media. She dismissed Galliano's statements as "theater" and later, in a phone interview with WWD described Galliano's videotaped behavior as "farce" and said she was bewildered that people in the fashion community have not recognized it as such. "It's theater," she said. "It's farce. But people in fashion don't recognize the farce in it. All of a sudden they don't know him. But it's OK when it's Mel Brooks' The Producers singing "Springtime for Hitler"."

Awards and nominations

Academy Awards

BAFTA Awards

Costume Designers Guild Awards

Emmy Awards

Satellite Awards

References

External links

1942 births
American costume designers
Women costume designers
American fashion designers
American women fashion designers
American people of Armenian descent
American people of Greek descent
Emmy Award winners
Lesbians
LGBT fashion designers
LGBT people from New York (state)
Living people
People from Queens, New York
Fashion stylists
21st-century American women